Edward Lawrence Kitsis (born February 4, 1971) is an American television writer and producer, best known for his work with his writing partner Adam Horowitz on the popular ABC drama series Lost and Once Upon a Time.

Early life and education
Kitsis was born to a Jewish American family, the son of Arlene and Tybe Kitsis of Minneapolis. In 1993, he graduated with a B.A. in radio, television, and film from the University of Wisconsin–Madison, where he met Adam Horowitz in his "Introduction to Film" class.

Career
After school, Kitsis travelled with Horowitz to Los Angeles. They initially started working as assistants and messengers until landing a job writing scripts for the remake of Fantasy Island. It was cancelled after 13 episodes, but they went on to write for both Felicity and Popular, before joining Lost.

Kitsis and Horowitz joined the crew of Lost midway through the first season as a writer and producer team in 2005. They were promoted to supervising producers for the second season in fall 2005. Kitsis, Horowitz and the writing staff won the Writers Guild of America (WGA) Award for Best Dramatic Series at the February 2006 ceremony for their work on the first and second seasons. They were promoted to co-executive producers for the third season in the 2006-2007 television season. They returned as a co-executive producers and writers for the fourth season in 2008. Kitsis and Horowitz were nominated for the WGA Award for Best Dramatic Series at the February 2009 ceremony for their work on the fourth season of Lost. They were promoted to executive producers for the fifth season in 2009. The writing staff was nominated for the WGA award for Best Dramatic Series again at the February 2010 ceremony for their work on the fifth season. Kitsis and Horowitz remained as executive producers and regular writers for the sixth and final season in 2010. During Lost's run, both Kitsis and Horowitz signed an overall deal with ABC Studios in 2007.

Kitsis also wrote Tron: Legacy, the sequel to the film Tron, with his partner Horowitz and wrote with the same co-writer the book for Universal Pictures future project "Ouija Board".

Kitsis and Horowitz are the creators of the fantasy drama series Once Upon a Time, which began airing on ABC on October 23, 2011. The show focuses on a town which is actually a parallel world populated by fairytale characters who are unaware of their true identity. The two came up with concept seven years prior joining the staff of Lost, but wanted to wait until it ended before they focused on this project. He also co-created the Once Upon a Time spin-off,  Once Upon a Time in Wonderland, along with partner Adam Horowitz, Zack Estrin and "Once" writer and Consulting Producer, Jane Espenson. The series, which began airing on ABC October 10, 2013, focuses on Alice searching for her true love, a genie named Cyrus, who is being kept from her by the Red Queen and Aladdin villain, Jafar, in a post-cursed Wonderland. Kitsis and Horowitz will also co-create and co-write a Beauty and the Beast miniseries for Disney+, alongside Josh Gad. The series, a prequel to Disney's 2017 remake of the 1991 film of the same name, was conceived after a discussion between Kitsis, Horowitz, and Gad following the cancellation of their planned Disney+ series, Muppets Live Another Day. In December 2019, it was announced that Kitsis and Horowitz began work on a new TV show focusing on characters from fairy tales and Disney titled Epic. The pilot was picked up by ABC in January 2021, however it was dropped in August of the same year.

He frequently collaborates with a tightly knit group of film professionals which include J. J. Abrams, Damon Lindelof, Adam Horowitz, Alex Kurtzman, Roberto Orci, Andre Nemec, Josh Appelbaum, Jeff Pinkner, and Bryan Burk.

Personal life
In May 2002, it was announced that he was engaged to Jennifer Susman, a 1999 TV and film graduate of the University of Texas. They married on March 29, 2003, in Scottsdale, Arizona.

Filmography

Film & Television

References

External links
 
 "Lost writers found in Madison", March 7, 2006, interview with Kitsis and Horowitz at the Hillel Foundation at the University of Wisconsin

1971 births
American male screenwriters
American soap opera writers
American television producers
Living people
Jewish American screenwriters
Writers Guild of America Award winners
American male television writers
Screenwriters from Minnesota
University of Wisconsin–Madison alumni
20th-century American screenwriters
20th-century American male writers
21st-century American screenwriters
21st-century American male writers
Showrunners
21st-century American Jews